Guilherme Schettine Guimarães (born 10 October 1995), known as Guilherme Schettine or simply Guilherme, is a Brazilian professional footballer who plays as a forward for Swiss Super League club Grasshopper on loan from Braga.

Club career
Born in Gama, Distrito Federal, Guilherme was an Atlético Paranaense youth graduate. He made his first team debut on 21 April 2013, coming on as a second half substitute for goalscorer Edigar Junio in a 3–1 Campeonato Paranaense home win against fierce rivals Coritiba. Seven days later he scored his first senior goal, but in a 1–4 away loss against Operário Ferroviário.

Rarely used during the following campaigns, Guilherme was loaned to Série C side Guaratinguetá on 27 July 2015. On 30 November he moved to fellow third-tier club Portuguesa, also in a temporary deal.

Returning to Furacão in July 2016, Guilherme made his Série A on 6 October by replacing Lucho González in a 3–1 home win against Chapecoense.

On 6 July 2021, he joined Vizela on a season-long loan.

On 25 July 2022, he signed a one-year loan deal with Grasshopper in the Swiss Super League. Grasshopper have a buy option for Schettine. It would be four weeks until he could make his first appearance for the club, due to a missing work permit. On 20 August 2020, he scored two goals in his first game, a Swiss Cup match against a team from the 4th tier, after coming on in the 61st minute.

References

External links

1995 births
Living people
Sportspeople from Federal District (Brazil)
Brazilian footballers
Association football forwards
Club Athletico Paranaense players
Guaratinguetá Futebol players
Associação Portuguesa de Desportos players
C.D. Santa Clara players
Al Batin FC players
Dibba FC players
S.C. Braga players
UD Almería players
F.C. Vizela players
Campeonato Brasileiro Série A players
Campeonato Brasileiro Série C players
Primeira Liga players
Saudi Professional League players
UAE Pro League players
Segunda División players
Brazilian expatriate footballers
Brazilian expatriate sportspeople in Portugal
Brazilian expatriate sportspeople in Saudi Arabia
Brazilian expatriate sportspeople in the United Arab Emirates
Brazilian expatriate sportspeople in Spain
Expatriate footballers in Portugal
Expatriate footballers in Saudi Arabia
Expatriate footballers in the United Arab Emirates
Expatriate footballers in Spain